The SPCA 90 was a civil transport aircraft built in France in the early 1930s.

Design and development
The SPCA 90 was a high-wing monoplane of conventional layout with a thick-sectioned, cantilever wing. The cabin was fully enclosed, and was large enough that the aircraft could be used as an air ambulance to carry two stretchers plus attendants. The fixed undercarriage consisted of divided main units and a tailskid. Only a single example was built (registration F-AKFJ), which saw service in Morocco.

In 1935, SPCA built an airliner version of the same design, designated 91T. The cargo area was fitted out as a passenger cabin with seats for eight passengers, a baggage compartment, and a lavatory. This was to be SPCA's last aircraft.

Variants
90 — utility aircraft (1 built)
91T — airliner

Specifications (90)

Notes

References

1930s French civil utility aircraft
SPCA aircraft
Trimotors
High-wing aircraft
Aircraft first flown in 1932